The 2004 Texas Longhorns football team represented the University of Texas at Austin in the 2004 NCAA Division I-A football season.  The team was coached by head football coach Mack Brown and led on the field by quarterback Vince Young. Ranked third in wins in Division I-A college football history, the University of Texas has traditionally been considered a college football powerhouse, but Brown had not managed to lead the Longhorns into a Bowl Championship Series (BCS) game.  The 2004 season included some controversy related to the selection of Texas as an at-large team to attend the 2005 Rose Bowl.  Brown coached the team to win that game with a thrilling last-second victory.  The victory brought the Longhorns to 11 wins and 1 loss for the season (11–1) and it earned the Longhorns a top 5 finish in the polls.

Schedule

Season highlights
This was followed by a narrow 22–20 win against unranked Arkansas. They defeated Rice and Baylor 35–13 and 44–14 respectively.

This left them ranked fifth coming into the annual matchup with then No. 2 Oklahoma in the Red River Shootout.  Oklahoma shut-out the Longhorns 12–0.  Texas dropped to No. 9, before rebounding with wins over No. 24 Missouri 28–20, at No. 24 Texas Tech 51–21, and at Colorado 31–7.

Then Texas set a record for the largest come from-behind-win in school history, beating No. 19 Oklahoma State 56–35 after falling behind 7–35.  After this performance, Texas again fell behind against Kansas but squeaked out a win 27–23. Kansas coach Mark Mangino stirred up controversy by claiming that the officials were biased in favor of Texas.

This brought UT back up to No. 5 in the rankings as they welcomed arch-rival Texas A&M to Austin and won 26–13.  However, Oklahoma stood undefeated, which meant the Sooners would represent the Big 12 South in the Championship game against a much lower ranked team from the North Division.  Once again, the loss to Oklahoma had kept Texas out of playing for a National or Conference Title, and had seemingly destined them to a non-Bowl Championship Series bowl as well.

However, Brown began lobbying the voters in the two polls based on human voters (one on college football coaches, the other on Associated Press (AP) writers) to place the Longhorns high enough in the rankings to ensure they received a Bowl Championship Series (BCS) bowl-bid.  The rules of the BCS were such that Texas might get left out of the eight chosen teams even though they ranked fifth nationally. The No. 4 California Golden Bears won their final regular season game 26–16 over 24-point underdog Southern Miss. Cal did not try to run-up the score at the end of the game. Several AP voters were besieged by fan emails and phone calls attempting to sway their votes, apparently spurred from Brown's pleas to rank Texas ahead of other "less deserving teams." Nine of the 65 AP voters switched Texas ahead of Cal, and three of them were from Texas. In the coaches poll, four voters moved Cal down to No. 7 and two to No. 8, when the week before none had them lower than No. 6. Meanwhile, two coaches moved Texas up to No. 3 when the team did not play that week. The Los Angeles Times wrote that accusations were raised about coaches manipulated voting, but the individual coaches' votes were not released to prove or disprove the allegations. The AP Poll makes its voters' records public. No. 6 Texas gained 23 points on No. 4 Cal in the AP poll, and the fifth-ranked Longhorns closed 43 points on the fourth-ranked Bears in the coaches poll. That allowed Texas to earn a BCS berth, finishing .0129 points ahead of Cal in the BCS standings after being .0013 points behind. In part because of the controversy with Texas' and Cal's BCS ranking, the AP poll withdrew from the BCS after the season. This lobbying effort and ensuing result led to criticism of Brown for playing politics to get his team into a top bowl.  Thus, he was no longer criticized for failing to get into a top bowl, he was criticized for doing so (and the way he had done it).

Rose Bowl

Source: ESPN

    
    
    
    
    
    
    
    
    
    
    
    

The appearance in the "Grand-daddy" of all bowl games was the first visit by the Longhorns, due mainly to the fact that the Rose Bowl traditionally pitted the winner of the Pac-10 against the winner of the Big Ten.  Texas' opponent was Michigan, whom Texas was playing for the very first time.  Texas and Michigan each had over 100 years of football history.  The meeting of the two teams set a college football record for the most games played collectively by two opponents before facing each other for the first time.

Texas won the game 38–37 on a last second field goal kick by Longhorn Dusty Mangum in what had been called one of the greatest Rose Bowl games of all time.  It was the only time in the history of the Rose Bowl that the game has been decided as time expired off the clock.  Vince Young set several Rose Bowl records and also won the Rose Bowl MVP award.

After the season
In the NFL Draft that followed, three Longhorns were drafted – RB Cedric Benson went 4th overall to Chicago Bears and Derrick Johnson went 15th overall to the Kansas City Chiefs.   TE Bo Scaife was picked in the 6th round by the Tennessee Titans and would be later reunited with quarterback Vince Young

With the exception of these players, most of the team returned to play for the 2005 Texas Longhorns football team, including redshirt sophomore quarterback Vince Young. Therefore, expectations were high coming into the 2005 season.   At the trophy presentation in Pasadena, Vince Young had proclaimed, "We'll be back!", referencing the fact that the Rose Bowl was the host for the next year's BCS National Championship.

See also
BCS controversies

References

Texas
Texas Longhorns football seasons
Rose Bowl champion seasons
Texas Longhorns football